Zegani is a village at an altitude of 320 meters from sea level in the Gagra District of Abkhazia, Georgia,  from Gagra. It is noted for its monastery complex, featuring a triple basilica.

History and demographics
In 1959, there were 209 people living in the village, mainly Armenians. By the 1989 census, the village had 90 inhabitants, again mostly Armenians.

Geography
Zegani lies to the southwest of Akvaskia and southwest of Ochamchire,  from Gagra. The Alazani River flows in the vicinity. Akuasnia Railway Station lies to the southeast. The area between the village and the Ochamchire-Tkvarceli Road to the east is forested.

Architecture
Zegani is noted for its monastery complex, and features a basilica with three churches, dedicated to the Virgin ("Kvela Cminda"). The Church of Our Lady measures  in overall length.

See also
 Gagra District

Notes

Literature 
 Georgian Soviet Encyclopedia, V. 4, p. 493, Tb., 1979.

References

Populated places in Gagra District